Domanowo  (Domanovo) is a village in the administrative district of Gmina Brańsk, within Bielsk County, Podlaskie Voivodeship, in north-eastern Poland.

According to the 1921 census, the village was inhabited by 453 people, among whom 444 were Roman Catholic, 3 were Orthodox, and 6 were Mosaic. At the same time, 444 inhabitants declared Polish nationality, 3 declared Belarusian nationality and 6 declared Jewish nationality. There were 70 residential buildings in the village.

References

Villages in Bielsk County